The first season of My Name Is Earl, an American television series created by Greg Garcia, that aired its pilot episode on September 20, 2005, at 9:00 p.m., ET/PT, on NBC, a U.S. broadcast television network. The DVD set was released on Region 2 on September 25, 2006, and on Region 1 on September 19, 2006. Its bonus material included: commentary for each episode, bloopers and deleted scenes. The show is broadcast in English, however in other countries it will be in other languages, there are also English subtitles. Season 1 of My Name Is Earl runs for about 526 minutes and about 20 minutes for each episode. The season 1 DVD is produced by 20th Century Fox Home Entertainment.
 
Most episodes from the first season begin with Earl presenting the premise of the series:

Ratings
The series premiered on September 20, 2005, drew in 14.9 million viewers in the United States, earning a 6.6 rating. By the airing of the third episode it was apparent that My Name Is Earl was the highest rated of NBC's new fall offerings, and a full season (22 episodes) was ordered. In its first month, it was also the highest rated new sitcom of the season to air on any network and was the highest rated sitcom on any network in the 18–49-year-old demographic. Metacritic.com gave season 1 a 77 of 100. Other reviews were mainly good.

Main cast
 Jason Lee as Earl Hickey
 Ethan Suplee as Randy Hickey
 Jaime Pressly as Joy Darville Turner
 Eddie Steeples as Darnell Turner
 Nadine Velazquez as Catalina

Awards and nomination
Jason Lee was nominated for the Golden Globes and the Screen Actors Guild award both for best actor in a comedy television series. The series was nominated for the 2006 Golden Globes for best comedy television series. Gregory Thomas Garcia won the 2005/06 Emmy Award for Outstanding Writing for a Comedy Series.

List of episodes

References

My Name Is Earl
2005 American television seasons
2006 American television seasons